Luis Abel Peña (born 7 January 1982 in Asunción, Paraguay) is a Paraguayan association football midfielder currently playing for Tristán Suárez of the Primera B Metropolitana in Argentina.

References
 
 

1982 births
Living people
Paraguayan footballers
Paraguayan expatriate footballers
San Martín de San Juan footballers
Club Almirante Brown footballers
CSyD Tristán Suárez footballers
Club Almagro players
Correcaminos UAT footballers
Lota Schwager footballers
Unión San Felipe footballers
Expatriate footballers in Chile
Expatriate footballers in Mexico
Expatriate footballers in Argentina
Expatriate footballers in Uruguay
Association football midfielders